Tihomir Naydenov (born 25 March 1986) is a Bulgarian football midfielder who plays for Lokomotiv Mezdra.

References

External links
 

1986 births
Living people
Bulgarian footballers
FC Botev Vratsa players
First Professional Football League (Bulgaria) players
Association football midfielders